Hanna-Renate Laurien (15 April 1928 – 12 March 2010) was a German politician of the Christian Democratic Union (CDU).

Biography 
Laurien was born in Danzig (then Free City of Danzig, present-day Gdańsk, Poland). She was baptized Lutheran and converted to Catholicism in the age of 24.
Laurien studied Germanistics, Philosophy, English and Slavic studies at the Free University of Berlin and started to work as a teacher in North Rhine-Westphalia.

In 1966 she joined the CDU in Cologne and in 1971 was appointed state secretary in Helmut Kohl's state cabinet of Rhineland-Palatinate, assigned to Culture Minister Bernhard Vogel, who became a close friend. From 1975 she also was an elected member of the Landtag of Rhineland-Palatinate. When Vogel became Minister-President in 1976, Laurien succeeded him as Minister for Education and Cultural Affairs.

In 1981, she became Senator of Education in the West Berlin Senate under Governing Mayor Richard von Weizsäcker, where her firm appearance earned her the nickname Hanna Granata ("Hanna the Grenade"). When Weizsäcker was elected President of Germany in 1984, Laurien ran within the CDU against Eberhard Diepgen for the candidacy as succeeding Governing Mayor, but only came off second best. She nevertheless maintained her office as Senator and from 1986 to 1989 also served as Vice Mayor. With Diepgen, Laurien had to resign from her office upon the 1989 Berlin state election.

In 1991 she was elected the first female presiding officer by the members of the Berlin Parliament (Abgeordnetenhaus), also the first after the Reunification of Germany. During her time in office, she committed herself against rising xenophobia and for the protection of human dignity from racist and Neo-Nazi attacks. She retired from office in 1995 and also left the national board of the CDU one year later.

From 1967 until 2000, Laurien, a consecrated virgin, served in the main committee member of the Central Committee of German Catholics. She also was a member of the Third Order of Saint Dominic and of the parish of Mater Dolorosa (Berlin-Lankwitz). She died in Berlin. The pontifical requiem for was celebrated by Georg Cardinal Sterzinsky on 29 March 2010.

Awards
Honorary degree of the University of Münster
Order of Merit of the Federal Republic of Germany, 1981

References 

1928 births
2010 deaths
Politicians from Gdańsk
German Roman Catholics
Converts to Roman Catholicism
Christian Democratic Union of Germany politicians
Senators of Berlin
Members of the Abgeordnetenhaus of Berlin
Free University of Berlin alumni
Knights Commander of the Order of Merit of the Federal Republic of Germany
Naturalized citizens of Germany
People from the Free City of Danzig
State ministers of Rhineland-Palatinate
Consecrated virgins